Kuntur Punta (Quechua kuntur condor, Ancash Quechua punta peak; ridge, "condor peak (or ridge)", also spelled Cóndor Punta) is a mountain in the Andes of Peru which reaches a height of approximately . It is located in the Junín Region, Tarma Province, Cajas District.

References 

Mountains of Peru
Mountains of Junín Region